The Canon EOS 30/33 (also known as the EOS Elan 7e/7) is a single-lens reflex film camera from Canon's EOS series, released in October 2000. This camera is sold in Japan under the name EOS 7. The EOS 30/ELAN 7E has eye controlled focusing while the EOS 33/ELAN 7 does not. Otherwise the two cameras are identical. It was replaced by a minor update with the EOS 30V/ELAN 7N.

External links

30